Michael A. Flaskey (born August 3, 1967), known as Mike Flaskey, is an American businessman, founder & CEO of Mike Flaskey Entertainment, and former chief executive officer of timeshare company Diamond Resorts. He is the founder and executive director of the Diamond Resorts Invitational and the Diamond Resorts Tournament of Champions, and the founder of the Hilton Grand Vacations Tournament of Champions, which is held annually in Orlando, Florida. Flaskey is also the founder of the Invited Celebrity Classic golf tournament, a PGA Tour Champions-sanctioned event.

Personal life
Flaskey attended Limestone University, previously known as Limestone College, where he was one of the first five players to sign with the Limestone baseball program under Hall of Famer Gaylord Perry and was named to the NAIA All-District team. He graduated in 1990 with a bachelor's degree in physical education. In 2009, he was inducted into the Limestone Athletics Hall of Fame.

Business activity
In August 2021, Flaskey facilitated Diamond Resorts' acquisition by Hilton Grand Vacations, departing Diamond Resorts to launch his own sports & entertainment company, Mike Flaskey Entertainment. In March 2017, Flaskey was named chief executive officer of Diamond Resorts International. Prior to joining Diamond Resorts, Flaskey held senior leadership positions with Starwood Vacation Ownership from October 2003 to July 2006 and with Fairfield Resorts (now Wyndham Vacation Ownership) from August 1992 to September 2003. He also serves on the board of directors for Diamond Resorts.

At Diamond Resorts, Flaskey launched Events of a Lifetime, an experiential vacation platform. He also is the founder of the Diamond Resorts Invitational, a mixed event celebrity golf tournament held annually in Orlando, Florida. In 2019, the tournament transformed into the Diamond Resorts Tournament of Champions, an official LPGA event featuring LPGA winners from the previous two seasons playing alongside a roster of world-class sports and entertainment celebrities. The tournament is now known as the HGV Tournament of Champions. 

Flaskey regularly appears on the MLB Network and has appeared several times on Golf Channel with professional golfers and celebrities, including John Daly and Lee Janzen.

References

1967 births
Living people